Julio Édson Uribe Elera (born 9 May 1982 in Lima) is a retired Peruvian footballer who played as a midfielder. He is the son of Julio César Uribe.

International career
He played for the Peru U-20 team in the 2001 Sudamericana sub-20.

Uribe made his senior debut with the Peru national football team against Paraguay in his team's first game in the 2001 Copa América. His father Julio César Uribe was the manager at the time and put Édson in for Abel Lobatón in the 68th minute of the match, which finished in a 3–3 draw. In total he has 2 caps for the Peru national team.

References

External links

1982 births
Living people
Footballers from Lima
Association football midfielders
Peruvian footballers
Peru international footballers
Juan Aurich footballers
Deportivo Maldonado players
Club Atlético Huracán footballers
Alianza Atlético footballers
Estudiantes de Medicina footballers
Unión Huaral footballers
Coronel Bolognesi footballers
Cienciano footballers
Total Chalaco footballers
ASA 2013 Târgu Mureș players
Unión Comercio footballers
Real Garcilaso footballers
Club Alianza Lima footballers
Peruvian Primera División players
Uruguayan Primera División players
Argentine Primera División players
Peruvian expatriate footballers
Expatriate footballers in Uruguay
Expatriate footballers in Argentina
Expatriate footballers in Romania